The Ultimate Collection is a compilation album by the American band Poco, released in 1998.

Track listing
"Pickin' Up the Pieces" (Richie Furay) – 3:20
"You Better Think Twice" (Jim Messina) – 3:21
"A Good Feelin' To Know" (Furay) – 4:06
"Bad Weather" (Paul Cotton) – 5:02
"Keep On Tryin’" (Timothy B. Schmit) – 2:54
"Makin’ Love" (Rusty Young) – 2:55
"Rose Of Cimarron" (Young) – 6:42
"Indian Summer" (Cotton) – 4:40
"Crazy Love" (Young) – 2:55
"Heart Of The Night" (Cotton) – 4:49
"Barbados" (Cotton) – 3:31
"Under The Gun" (Cotton) – 3:11
"Midnight Rain" (Cotton) – 4:25
"Widowmaker" (Young) – 4:25
"Streets Of Paradise" (Cotton) – 3:55
"Shoot For The Moon" (Young) – 2:48
"Days Gone By" (Cotton) – 3:50
"Call It Love" (Ron Gilbeau, Billy Crain, Rick Lonow) – 4:17

Personnel
Jim Messina - guitar, vocals
Richie Furay - guitar, 12-string guitar, vocals
Rusty Young - steel guitar, banjo, dobro, guitar, piano
George Grantham - drums, vocals
Randy Meisner - bass, guitar, vocals
Timothy B. Schmit - bass, vocals
Paul Cotton - guitar, vocals
Charlie Harrison - bass, vocals
Steve Chapman – drums
Kim Bullard – keyboards, vocals

References

Poco compilation albums
1998 greatest hits albums